The Hamðismál is a poem which ends the heroic poetry of the Poetic Edda, and thereby the whole collection.

Gudrun had been the wife of the hero Sigurd, whom her brothers had killed. With Sigurd she had had the daughter Svanhild, who had married to the Goth king Ermanaric (Jörmunrekkr). Ermanaric had Svanhild trampled to death by horses, due to which Gudrun wants vengeance, and she agitates her sons (see Jonakr's sons) from a later marriage to kill Ermanaric, cf. Guðrúnarhvöt.

The poem is considered to belong to the oldest of the heroic poems, probably from the 9th century. It makes an archaic impression with its bitter and laconic language. Howling with wrath, the brothers Hamdir and Sörli ride over a misty mountain. The last lines are like carved on a runestone:

Sources and historic basis
The legend of Jörmunrek appears in the Poetic Edda as Hamðismál and Guðrúnarhvöt. It also appears in Bragi Boddason's Ragnarsdrápa, in the Völsunga saga and in Gesta Danorum.

Jordanes wrote in 551 that the Gothic king Ermanaric was upset with the attack of a subordinate king and had his wife Sunilda (i.e. Svanhild) torn to pieces by horses, and as revenge Ermanaric was pierced with spears by her brothers Ammius (Hamdir) and  Sarus (Sörli) and died from the wounds. The Annals of Quedlinburg (end of the 10th century) relates that the brothers Hemidus (Hamdir), Serila (Sörli) and Adaccar (Erp/Odoacer) had cut off the hands of Ermanarik.

References
Nationalencyklopedin
Nordisk familjebok

External links
Hamðismál in Old Norse.
 Hamðismál (Old Norse)
 Hamðismál (English)

9th-century poems
Eddic poetry
Nibelung tradition